Raffael Behounek (born 16 April 1997) is an Austrian professional footballer who plays as a centre-back for Austrian Bundesliga club WSG Tirol.

Club career
On 19 August 2020, he signed with WSG Swarovski Tirol.

References

Living people
1997 births
Association football defenders
Austrian footballers
SV Mattersburg players
SV Horn players
FC Wacker Innsbruck (2002) players
WSG Tirol players
Austrian Football Bundesliga players
2. Liga (Austria) players
Austrian people of Czech descent